The Johnny Cash Show is an American television music variety show hosted by Johnny Cash. The Screen Gems 58-episode series ran from June 7, 1969, to March 31, 1971, on ABC; it was taped at the Ryman Auditorium in Nashville, Tennessee. The show reached No. 17 in the Nielsen ratings in 1970.

Cash opened each show, invariably preceding the first number with his customary "Hello, I'm Johnny Cash" greeting, and its regulars included members of his touring troupe, June Carter Cash (his wife) and the Carter Family, The Statler Brothers, Carl Perkins, and The Tennessee Three, with Australian-born musical director-arranger-conductor Bill Walker. The Statler Brothers performed brief comic interludes. An instrumental version of "Folsom Prison Blues" was used for the opening credits.

It featured many folk, singer-songwriter and country musicians, such as Joni Mitchell, Bob Dylan, Linda Ronstadt, Kris Kristofferson, Mickey Newbury, Neil Young, Gordon Lightfoot, Merle Haggard, James Taylor, Tammy Wynette and Roy Orbison. It also featured other musicians such as jazz great Louis Armstrong, who died eight months after appearing on the show.

Background
Cash had been approached by ABC to host a television show after the major success of his two live prison albums, At Folsom Prison and At San Quentin. The show started with an hour-long tryout offered by ABC as "a summer replacement for its Saturday night variety extravaganza The Hollywood Palace." While Cash had a large degree of freedom, he "had to accept some compromises by hosting showbiz royalty like Bob Hope, George Gobel, Kirk Douglas, Burl Ives, Peggy Lee and Lorne Greene. They gave the show gravitas that satisfied both advertisers and the network".

Format
The show was recorded at Nashville's Ryman Auditorium, then home of the Grand Ole Opry. The show was conceived by Bill Carruthers, who also served as executive producer and director for the first season. Stan Jacobson was also a producer on the show. Myles Harmon was the program executive for ABC Television. The first show featured Joni Mitchell, Cajun fiddler Doug Kershaw, Fannie Flagg as a comic, and Bob Dylan.

The show included a "Country Gold" segment which featured legends rarely or never seen on network TV such as Bill Monroe and his Blue Grass Boys. Author Rich Kienzle suggests that as well as providing entertainment, the show operated as a "Country Music 101".

Cash persisted in the face of ABC "network anxieties" on several occasions. He refused to cut the word "stoned" from Kris Kristofferson's "Sunday Morning Coming Down", he stood by his Christian faith "despite network anxieties", and persisted in bringing on Pete Seeger whose anti-Vietnam War song on another network had "caused a firestorm". He premiered his "Man in Black" song on an episode taped at Nashville's Vanderbilt University campus.

In 1970, Columbia Records released The Johnny Cash Show, a live album, as a tie-in with the TV series, though the record is not considered a soundtrack. The release is unusual as Columbia was affiliated with competing network CBS. Cash's version of Kris Kristofferson's "Sunday Morning Coming Down", included on the series, is included on the album and was released as a single, which was a major hit for Cash.

One unusual taping occurred in 1971. Cash began the program assuming it was a regular episode. Moments after Cash greeted the audience, June Carter Cash came on stage and said she had a special guest. Ralph Edwards then joined the two on stage; as the audience erupted in a standing ovation, Cash realized that it was actually a taping for an installment of This Is Your Life honoring him.

Series overview

List of episodes

Season 1 (1969–1970)
32 episodes

Season 2 (1970–1971)
26 episodes

Cancellation
The show was canceled in 1971 in response to the Prime Time Access Rule, which eliminated a half-hour of network prime time programming from all of the major networks' nightly schedules. Cash's show was one of many that had strong rural followings that were canceled across the networks in what came to be known as the "rural purge."

Revival
In 1976, CBS ran a revival of the show, Johnny Cash and Friends, as a replacement series for four weeks from August 29 to September 20, 1976. The new show was taped at the newly constructed Grand Ole Opry House in Nashville. Aside from musical performances, this series also featured a greater emphasis on comedy, with Steve Martin and Jim Varney appearing as regulars, and with June Carter Cash performing several comedy routines as "Aunt Polly" (reviving a character she had performed early in her career).

Following Johnny Cash and Friends, an annual Johnny Cash Christmas Special series was launched, starting in 1976, with specials airing almost every year until 1985.

The Best of The Johnny Cash TV Show
A DVD set featuring 66 live performances from the show, called The Best of The Johnny Cash TV Show, was released in Region 1 on September 18, 2007. The DVD set was hosted by Kris Kristofferson and directed by Michael B. Borofsky, and was produced by Reverse Angle Productions for Sony Pictures Entertainment and Legacy Recordings, Sony Music Entertainment's catalog division. An accompanying CD, featuring selected numbers from the show (some of them not on the DVD set), was also released.

DVD track list 

DVD 1
 Johnny Cash – Ring Of Fire
 Bob Dylan – I Threw It All Away
From Season 1, Episode 1, originally aired June 7, 1969.
 Bob Dylan and Johnny Cash – Girl From The North Country
From Season 1, Episode 1, originally aired June 7, 1969.
 Kris Kristofferson – Loving Her Was Easier (Than Anything I'll Ever Do Again)
 Louis Armstrong and Johnny Cash – Blue Yodel No. 9
From Season 2, Episode 6, originally aired October 28, 1970.
 Stevie Wonder – Heaven Help Us All
From Season 2, Episode 8, originally aired November 11, 1970.
 Creedence Clearwater Revival – Bad Moon Rising
From Season 1, Episode 15, originally aired September 27, 1969.
 Linda Ronstadt and Johnny Cash – I Never Will Marry
 George Jones – Medley (White Lightning with Johnny Cash, She Thinks I Still Care, Love Bug, The Race Is On)
 Johnny Cash – Hey Porter
 Waylon Jennings – Medley (Only Daddy That'll Walk The Line, The Singing Star's Queen, Brown Eyed Handsome Man)
 Tammy Wynette – Stand By Your Man
From Season 2, Episode 17, originally aired January 28, 1971.
 Marty Robbins – Medley (Big Iron, Running Gun, El Paso)
From Season 1, Episode 17, originally aired January 28, 1970.
 Johnny Cash – Come Along And Ride This Train
 Johnny Cash – As Long As The Grass Shall Grow
 Johnny Cash – Man in Black
 James Taylor – Sweet Baby James
From Season 2, Episode 20, originally aired February 17, 1971.
 Pete Seeger and Johnny Cash – Cripple Creek
 Pete Seeger and Johnny Cash – Worried Man Blues
 Johnny Cash – Sunday Morning Coming Down
 Johnny Cash – Old Time Religion
 Johnny Cash, The Carter Family, The Statler Brothers, Carl Perkins and The Tennessee Three – Daddy Sang Bass
 Mother Maybelle and The Carter Sisters – Wildwood Flower
 Neil Young – The Needle and the Damage Done
From Season 2, Episode 20, originally aired February 17, 1971.
 Johnny Cash and The Tennessee Three – Tennessee Flat Top Box
 Joni Mitchell and Johnny Cash – The Long Black Veil
From Season 1, Episode 6, originally aired July 19, 1969.
 Johnny Cash and The Tennessee Three with Carl Perkins – Big River

DVD 2 
 Johnny Cash – I Walk The Line
 June Carter Cash – A Good Man
 Derek and the Dominos – It's Too Late
From Season 2, Episode 14, originally aired January 6, 1971.
 Derek and the Dominos with Johnny Cash and Carl Perkins – Matchbox
 Charley Pride – Able Bodied Man
 Chorus & Johnny Cash – Country Gold Intro
 Bill Monroe And His Blue Grass Boys – Blue Moon Of Kentucky
From Season 2, Episode 8, originally aired November 11, 1970.
 Loretta Lynn – I Know How
From Season 1, Episode 30, originally aired April 29, 1970.
 Jerry Lee Lewis – Whole Lotta Shakin' Goin' On
 Johnny Cash – Ride This Train
 Johnny Cash – America The Beautiful
 Johnny Cash – This Land Is Your Land
 The Everly Brothers with Ike Everly and Johnny and Tommy Cash – That Silver Haired Daddy Of Mine
 Ray Charles – Ring Of Fire
 Johnny Cash – A Boy Named Sue
 Conway Twitty – Hello Darlin'
 Mother Maybelle Carter – Black Mountain Rag
 Tony Joe White and Johnny Cash – Polk Salad Annie
 Glen Campbell – Wichita Lineman
From Season 2, Episode 10, originally aired November 25, 1970.
 Neil Diamond – Cracklin' Rosie
 Ray Price – For The Good Times
 Roy Orbison – Cryin'
From Season 1, Episode 15, originally aired September 27, 1969.
 Roy Orbison and Johnny Cash – Pretty Woman
From Season 1, Episode 15, originally aired September 27, 1969.
 Johnny Cash – Wanted Man
 Chet Atkins and Johnny Cash – Recuerdo De La Alhambra
 Chet Atkins – Medley (Back Home in Indiana, Country Gentleman, Mister Sandman, Wildwood Flower, Freight Train)
From Season 1, Episode 30, originally aired April 29, 1970.
 June Carter Cash with Homer And Jethro – Baby, It's Cold Outside
 Merle Haggard – No Hard Times
 Merle Haggard and Johnny Cash – Sing Me Back Home
 Carl Perkins – Blue Suede Shoes
From Season 2, Episode 16, originally aired January 21, 1971.
 Johnny Cash, Carl Perkins, The Carter Family and The Statler Brothers – The Old Account Was Settled Long Ago
 Roy Clark – Medley (In The Summertime, 12th Street Rag)
From Season 1, Episode 6, originally aired July 19, 1969.
 The Statler Brothers – Flowers on the Wall
 Johnny Cash – Working Man Blues
 Johnny Cash and June Carter Cash – Jackson
 Johnny Cash and June Carter Cash – Turn Around
 Johnny Cash and June Carter Cash – I Love You Because
 Hank Williams Jr. – Medley (You Win Again, Cold Cold Heart, I Can't Help It If I'm Still in Love With You, Half As Much)
 Johnny Cash – A Wonderful Time Up There

CD track list 
  Johnny Cash – I Walk the Line
  Johnny Cash – Flesh and Blood
  Tammy Wynette – Stand by Your Man
  George Jones – She Thinks I Still Care / Love Bug / The Race Is On
  Johnny Cash – I've Been Everywhere
  Bobby Bare – Detroit City
  Ray Charles – Ring of Fire
  Derek and the Dominoes – It's Too Late
  Kris Kristofferson – Loving Her Was Easier (Than Anything I'll Ever Do Again)
  Roy Orbison – Only the Lonely / Oh, Pretty Woman
  Johnny Cash with The Carter Family and The Statler Brothers – Belshazzar
  Waylon Jennings – Brown Eyed Handsome Man
  Johnny Cash and Joni Mitchell – Girl From the North Country
  James Taylor – Fire and Rain
  Johnny Cash, The Carter Family, The Statler Brothers, Carl Perkins and The Tennessee Three – Daddy Sang Bass
  Johnny Cash – Closing Monologue – I Walk the Line (reprise)

External links

On TV.com

Notes

1960s American music television series
1970s American music television series
American Broadcasting Company original programming
1969 American television series debuts
1971 American television series endings
Television series by Sony Pictures Television
Country music television series
English-language television shows